The 2023 season is the 114th season in the history of Sport Club Corinthians Paulista. The season covers the period from January 2023 to December 2023. The pre-season began earlier than usual in December 14, 2022, as the previous season was shorter due to the 2022 FIFA World Cup taking place at the end of the year.

The club will also hold elections in November to determine the new president and deliberative council for the 2024–2026 term.

Background

Kit
 Home: White shirt, black shorts and white socks;
 Away: Black shirt, white shorts and black socks;
 Third: Beige shirt with shodô stripes, black shorts and beige socks.

Squad

Managerial changes
On November 13, 2022, Corinthians' president Duílio Monteiro Alves announced that Vítor Pereira would not renew his contract to continue as the club's manager for the 2023 season. Pereira supposedly revealed that he had family issues that required his return to Portugal. He claimed in a social media post that his reasons to leave were exclusively health issues related to his mother in law. However a month later, he was announced as the new head coach of Flamengo for the 2023 season.

On November 20, head of performance analysis Fernando Lázaro was announced as the club's new manager. He was scheduled to serve as Brazil's opponents scout in the 2022 FIFA World Cup before taking the job.

Transfers

Transfers in

Loans in

Transfers out

Loans out

Squad statistics

Overview

Campeonato Paulista

For the 2023 Campeonato Paulista, the 16 teams are divided in four groups of 4 teams (A, B, C, D). They will face all teams, except those that are in their own group, with the top two teams from each group qualifying for the quarterfinals. The two overall worst teams will be relegated.

First stage

Knockout stages

Copa Libertadores

Corinthians will enter the competition in the group stage.

Campeonato Brasileiro

Results

Copa do Brasil

Corinthians will enter the competition in the third round.

See also
List of Sport Club Corinthians Paulista seasons

Notes

References

Sport Club Corinthians Paulista seasons
Corinthians